The Corsican Brothers is a 1985 TV movie based on the 1844 novella The Corsican Brothers by Alexandre Dumas. It was directed by Ian Sharp and produced by Norman Rosemont.

Plot
The da Franchi family is locked in a deadly vendetta with the de Guidici family in 19th century Corsica. Lucien and Louis da Franchi are twin brothers. Lucien wants to continue Corsican traditions, while Louis wants to end the vendetta and declare peace. Both brothers are in love with Annamaria de Guidici.

Cast
Trevor Eve as Louis Da Franchi; Lucien Da Franchi
Geraldine Chaplin as Madame Da Franchi
Olivia Hussey as Annamaria De Guidice
Nicholas Clay as Giordano Martelli
Jean Marsh as Mazzere
Benedict Taylor as Georges Du Caillaud
Simon Ward as Duc Dechateau Renaud
Donald Pleasence as Chancellor
James Hazeldine as Vincente Da Franchi
Patsy Kensit-Healy as Emilie Du Caillaud
Margaret Tyzack as Madame Deguidice
Mark Ryan as Bernardo De Guidice

Production
The lead role was originally meant to be played by Pierce Brosnan, then best known for Remington Steele. However he read the script for the feature film Nomads and decided to make that instead. It turned out that Corsican producer Norman Rosemont was unable to accommodate Brosnan's limited schedule.

Instead the producers cast Trevor Eve, who several CBS executives had seen on stage in London.

The film was shot in Aix-en-Provence and the south of France hill village of Cipieres.

Star Trevor Eve said "Lucien was the hunter. I played him as a rough, tough kid. The kind who as a boy yelled a lot and developed a hoarseness in his voice. He dressed roughly and wore the same clothes every day. His hair was wild and was never washed. Louis was more cerebral and refined. He was better groomed. It was easier to play Lucien. You could flop out of bed in the morning and go to the set without brushing your hair."

Reception
The New York Times called it "giddy escapist hookum" which "nevertheless skillfully recaptures the flavour and rhythms of old-time Technicolor words-and-daggers romps".

The Chicago Tribune said the film "has an old-fashioned look and a few drawbacks. Its sword play rings of clashing steel, but its dialogue has the clunk of wood, despite the best efforts of a sterling cast."

References

External links
The Corsican Brothers at IMDb
The Corsican Brothers at BFI
The Corsican Brothers at TCMDB

1985 television films
1985 films
American swashbuckler films
Films based on The Corsican Brothers
Films set in Corsica
American historical films
Television shows based on works by Alexandre Dumas
1980s American films